Bernardo R. (Perez) Calvo (born November 16, 1945 in Tlacotalpan, Veracruz) played in and managed in the Mexican League, the highest level of professional baseball in Mexico. He played professionally from 1965 to at least 1979 and he managed from 1991 to 1997 and in 2005.

References

Living people
1945 births
Minor league baseball players
Minor league baseball managers
Baseball players from Veracruz
People from Tlacotalpan
Mexican League baseball players
20th-century Mexican people